Sheridan Township is an inactive township in Jasper County, in the U.S. state of Missouri.

Sheridan Township has the name of Philip Sheridan (1831–1888), United States Army General.

References

Townships in Missouri
Townships in Jasper County, Missouri